Probable ATP-dependent RNA helicase DDX23 is an enzyme that in humans is encoded by the DDX23 gene.

This gene encodes a member of the DEAD box protein family. DEAD box proteins, characterized by the conserved motif Asp-Glu-Ala-Asp (DEAD), are putative RNA helicases. They are implicated in a number of cellular processes involving alteration of RNA secondary structure, such as translation initiation, nuclear and mitochondrial splicing, and ribosome and spliceosome assembly. Based on their distribution patterns, some members of this family are believed to be involved in embryogenesis, spermatogenesis, and cellular growth and division. The protein encoded by this gene is a component of the U5 snRNP complex; it may facilitate conformational changes in the spliceosome during nuclear pre-mRNA splicing. An alternatively spliced transcript variant has been found for this gene, but its biological validity has not been determined.

References

Further reading

Spliceosome